Melanocinclis vibex is a moth in the family Cosmopterigidae. It is found in North America, where it has been recorded from Florida.

The wingspan is about 8 mm. Adults have been recorded on wing from May to July.

The larvae possibly feed in the flowers of Serenoa repens.

References

Natural History Museum Lepidoptera generic names catalog

Cosmopteriginae
Moths described in 1978